Walter "Schoko" Schachner (born 1 February 1957) is a football manager and former player, who played as a forward. He made 64 appearances scoring 23 goals for the Austria national team.

As he always brought chocolate to the games when he was a boy, he got the nickname schoko. He was one of the most successful Austrian players in Italian football, as he played for four clubs over seven years.

Club career
Schachner was born in Leoben, Austria. Much-travelled, he started his professional career at local outfit Alpine Donawitz at 18 in the 1975–76 season, earning a place in the national team after only one and a half season. He was duly picked up by Vienna club Austria Wien but moved abroad to play in Italy for seven years, from 1981 to 1988, in A.C. Cesena (58 matches, 17 goals), Torino F.C. (85 matches, 18 goals) and Avellino (48 matches 13 goals).

In 1981 when Cesena was promoted to Serie A, the ultras changed their title to Weisschwarz Brigaden (meaning “Black-and-white Brigades” in German language) to honor the Austrian forward. He returned to Austria in 1988, moving from one club to another and mostly in the second division before finally hanging up his boots at 41 years of age at Eintracht Wels.

International career
Schachner made his debut for the Austria national team in a December 1976 World Cup qualification match against Malta and was a participant at the 1978 and 1982 FIFA World Cups. He earned 64 caps, scoring 23 goals. His final international game was an August 1994 friendly match against Russia which was his farewell match since he was replaced by Harald Cerny early in the game and he had played his previous international over four years earlier.

On 21 June 1978, at the World Cup held in Argentina he was among starting 11 of the Austrian team that beat the reigning champions, West Germany 3–2 and eliminated them from the competition, a historic match named “The Miracle of Cordoba”. Conversely, he was also a member of the Austrian team that lost 1–0 to West Germany in 1982 in the "Disgrace of Gijón" but distinguished himself by making an effort to actually play a normal game.

Managerial career
Schachner started his career as a coach in the 1999–2000 season with FC Zeltweg and led them to promotion from the fourth to the third division.

In the 2000–01 and 2001–02 seasons he coached FC Kärnten in the Austrian First League. Under his leadership the team was promoted to the Austrian Bundesliga and won the National Cup in the first year and the National Supercup in the second.

At the start of the 2002–03 season Schachner coached FK Austria Wien in the Austrian Bundesliga until he was replaced by Christoph Daum in early October 2002 despite an excellent start to the season. At the time of his dismissal the team led the championship with seven points ahead of the second-place team and had just defeated Ukrainian champions Shakhtar Donetsk 5–2 in the UEFA Cup.

A few days after his dismissal he was hired by Grazer AK, which held the penultimate place in the Austrian Bundesliga. The team finished the season in second place behind Austria Wien. In the 2003–04 season Schachner led Grazer AK to win their first and so far their only national champions title. In the same season they also won the Austrian Cup. In 2004–05 the team were runners-up in the Bundesliga and in the 2005 UEFA Champions League faced Liverpool (coached by Rafael Benitez), the future winners of the title, in the third qualification round.  Grazer AK managed to win the return leg at Anfield 1-0, after the home defeat of 2–0. In January 2006 he was sacked by Grazer AK, officially to reduce costs, but in reality because he was in talks with several other clubs.

Schachner moved to TSV 1860 Munich who were in the 2. Bundesliga at the time and avoided relegation only in the penultimate round. The club was going through difficulties in those years and faced economic problems. On 9 March 2007, he and 1860 Munich agreed to terminate his contract at the end of the 2006–07 season, effective on 30 June of the same year. His successor was Marco Kurz.

Schachner signed a new contract at SK Austria Kärnten in April 2007. He did not achieve the desired results with the newly-formed team and was fired by the management in December of that year.

In August 2008, Schachner replaced Heinz Peischl, the coach of FC Admira Wacker Mödling (Austrian First League), who had been sacked for gaining only one point in five games which left the team at the bottom of the rankings. With Schachner the team finished the season in the third place. Moreover, Admira Wacker Mödling reached the National Cup final for the first time in thirteen years, but were defeated by Austria Wien 3–1.
He remained as coach of Admira Wacker Mödling for the 2009–10 season before being replaced by their youth team coach on 26 April 2010, leaving the team in third place with four points behind the leader, struggling for promotion 6 rounds before the end of the season.

Honours

Player
Austria Wien
 Austrian Bundesliga: 1979, 1980, 1981
 Austrian Cup: 1980

Individual
 Austrian Bundesliga top scorer: 1979, 1980
 Coppa Italia top scorer: 1984 (eight goals)

Manager
Austria Wien
 Austrian Cup: 2001

Grazer AK
 Austrian Bundesliga: 2004
 Austrian Cup: 2004
 Austrian Supercup: 2001

References

External links
Profile – Austria Archive

1957 births
Living people
People from Leoben
Austrian footballers
Austria international footballers
1978 FIFA World Cup players
1982 FIFA World Cup players
FK Austria Wien players
A.C. Cesena players
Torino F.C. players
Pisa S.C. players
U.S. Avellino 1912 players
SK Sturm Graz players
Grazer AK players
FC Tirol Innsbruck players
Austrian Football Bundesliga players
Serie A players
Expatriate footballers in Italy
Austrian expatriate footballers
Austrian expatriate sportspeople in Italy
Austrian football managers
FC Kärnten managers
FK Austria Wien managers
Grazer AK managers
TSV 1860 Munich managers
SK Austria Kärnten managers
LASK managers
FC Admira Wacker Mödling managers
Expatriate football managers in Germany
Association football forwards
Footballers from Styria
Austrian expatriate sportspeople in Germany
Austrian expatriate football managers